Route 4 is a National Road in Bolivia. It is 1,657 kilometres in length, and crosses Bolivia from west to east, from the Cordillera Occidental on the Chilean border to the lowlands by the Brazilian border.

Route 4 was declared part of the Bolivian National Road Network by Decree 25.134 of 31 August 1998.

Route 
Route 4 encompasses the departments of Oruro, La Paz, Cochabamba and Santa Cruz. It begins in the west as a continuation of the Chilean Ruta 11, at Tambo Quemado and terminates in the east in the town of  Puerto Suárez. From here, Puerto Busch is accessible. 

Roue 4 was declared part of the Bolivian National Road Network by Decree 25.134 of 31 August 1998.

Sections

Oruro Department 

 0 km - Tambo Quemado
 20 km - Sajama
 93 km - Curahuara de Carangas

La Paz Department 

 132 km - bridge over Rio Desaguadero
 134 km - Callapa
 188 km - Patacamaya

Oruro Department 

 188 km - Caracollo
 196 km - Villa Pata
 205 km - Ocotavi
 211 km - Cohani
 218 km - Lequepalca

La Paz Department 

 226 km - Huayllamarca

Cochabamba Department 

 242 km - Lacolaconi
 252 km - Japo Kasa
 260 km - Tallija Confital
 271 km - Challa Grande
 284 km - Pongo Kasa
 288 km - Kjarkas
 290 km - Kallani Centro
 299 km - Huarancaiza
 305 km - Kochi Pampas
 315 km - Llavini
 337 km - Pirque
 339 km - Parotani
 345 km - Sipe Sipe
 357 km - Vinto
 364 km - Quillacollo
 377 km - Cochabamba
 393 km - Sacaba
 425 km - Colomi
 507 km - Puente Esperitu Santo II
 539km - Villa Tunari
 558 km - Shinahota
 568 km - Chimoré
 599 km - Ivirgarzama
 644 km - Entre Ríos
 665 km - Bulo Bulo

Santa Cruz Department 

 685 km - Nuevo Horizons
 697 km - San German
 704 km - El Palmar
 712 km - San Isidro Chore

References 

Roads in Bolivia